The county of Cumbria is divided into six districts. The districts of Cumbria are Borough of Barrow-in-Furness, District of South Lakeland, Borough of Copeland, Borough of Allerdale, District of Eden, City of Carlisle.

As there are 460 Grade II* listed buildings in the county they have been split into separate lists for each district.

 Grade II* listed buildings in Allerdale
 Grade II* listed buildings in Barrow-in-Furness (borough)
 Grade II* listed buildings in the City of Carlisle
 Grade II* listed buildings in Copeland
 Grade II* listed buildings in Eden
 Grade II* listed buildings in South Lakeland

See also
 Grade I listed buildings in Cumbria
 :Category:Grade II* listed buildings in Cumbria

References
National Heritage List for England

 
 
 Grade II*